Emad Hamdy (born 14 January 1993) is an Egyptian footballer who plays as a defensive midfielder for Egyptian Premier League side Ismaily. During the 2018–19 season, he earned the player of the season award with Ismaily.

References

External links

1993 births
Living people
People from Dakahlia Governorate
Egyptian footballers
Association football midfielders
Egyptian Premier League players
El Mansoura SC players
Ismaily SC players